Sphaerolobium nudiflorum is a species of flowering plant in the family Fabaceae and is endemic to the south-west of Western Australia. It was first formally described in 1844 by Carl Meissner who gave it the name Roea nudiflora in Lehmann's Plantae Preissianae. In 1864, George Bentham changed the name to Sphaerolobium nudiflorum in Flora Australiensis The specific epithet (nudiflorum) means "bare-flowered".

This pea grows on flats and granite hills in the Esperance Plains, Jarrah Forest and Warren bioregions of south-western Western Australia and is listed as "not threatened" by the Government of Western Australia Department of Biodiversity, Conservation and Attractions.

References 

nudiflorum
Fabales of Australia
Eudicots of Western Australia
Plants described in 1844
Taxa named by Carl Meissner